Costa Pacifica is a Concordia-class cruise ship for Costa Crociere. She was handed over to Costa Crociere on 29 May 2009. Her sister ships, Costa Concordia and Costa Serena, were launched in 2006 and in 2007, with Costa Favolosa and Costa Fascinosa launched in 2011 and 2012 respectively.

Concept and construction

Costa Pacifica is the third ship of the Concordia-class, preceded by sister ships Costa Concordia and Costa Serena and was followed by Costa Favolosa and Costa Fascinosa on 2011 and 2012, all part of the expansion program of Costa which entailed an investment of 2.4 billion Euro, and is currently the largest fleet expansion program in the world.

Costa Pacifica was ordered on 14 December 2005, by Carnival Corporation, the parent company of Costa Crociere.

The bow section of Costa Pacifica was built at the Fincantieri Palermo shipyard and was launched on 24 July 2007. The section was then towed to Fincantieri's Sestri Ponente in August 2007 for further work, which also marked the announcement of the ships name. She was launched at Fincantieri's Sestri Ponente shipyard on 30 June 2008. She returned to Sestri Ponente from her sea trials on 30 March 2009, for the fitting-out process. Almost 3,000 workers helped in the construction of Costa Pacifica.

She was later christened at Genoa, Italy on 5 June 2009, in a dual christening ceremony, together with Costa Luminosa.

Amenities
Costa Pacifica has 1,504 passenger cabins of various sizes. There are five dining areas, thirteen bars, four swimming pools, various water and health related  facilities and a theater. Costa Pacifica is also the first cruise ship to have an onboard recording studio.

Operation history
The maiden voyage of Costa Pacifica was on 6 June 2009, an eight-day cruise and departed in Savona, with a special 48-hour layover in Palma de Mallorca, Spain.

In the entire 2009 summer season, Costa Pacifica offered seven day cruises in the Western Mediterranean, with calls at Rome, Savona, Marseilles, Barcelona, Palma, Tunis, Malta and Palermo.

During the 2009-2010 winter season, Costa Pacifica departed from Rome and Savona, offering 10- and 11-day cruises in Egypt, Israel and Turkey. In Summer 2010, she offered seven day cruises in the Western Mediterranean, with calls at Rome, Savona, Barcelona, Palma, Tunis, Malta and Catania.

Incidents and accidents
On 11 December 2012 Costa Pacifica struck a piling while maneuvering into dock at the Port of Marseille, France. The cause of the damage is blamed on heavy wind, an  gash was left on her hull above the waterline. Her itinerary was not delayed.

References

External links 

 
 Ship Builder's Page On Costa Pacifica
 Costa Pacifica specification

2008 ships
Maritime incidents in 2012
Ships built by Fincantieri
Ships of Costa Cruises